Jawad Kalai (born 29 July 2000) is a French professional footballer who plays as a midfielder for Wasquehal, on loan from Ligue 2 club Valenciennes.

Career
Kalai started his football career at CAS Escaudoeuvres, before he joined Cambrai at the age of eight. Later, he moved to Valenciennes as an under-14 player. Kalai stayed at Valenciennes for two years, before returning to Cambrai in 2016. In January 2018, Kalai was promoted to Cambrai's first team, playing in the Régional 1.

In July 2020, Kalai joined Belgian club UR La Louvière. From the 2021–22 season, he returned to Valenciennes, where he started on the club's reserve team, playing in the Championnat National 3. However, on 8 January 2022, Kalai got his professional debut for Valenciennes in Ligue 2 in a game against Guingamp, where he came on from the bench for the last minute. On 1 September 2022, Kalai joined Wasquehal on loan until the end of the season.

Personal life
Born in France, Kalai is of Moroccan descent.

References

External links

2000 births
Living people
People from Cambrai
French footballers
French expatriate footballers
French sportspeople of Moroccan descent
Association football midfielders
Régional 1 players
Championnat National 3 players
Ligue 2 players
AC Cambrai players
UR La Louvière Centre players
Valenciennes FC players
Wasquehal Football players
French expatriate sportspeople in Belgium
Expatriate footballers in Belgium
Sportspeople from Nord (French department)
Footballers from Hauts-de-France